Zodarion spinibarbe is a spider species found in Crete.

See also 
 List of Zodariidae species

References

External links 

spinibarbe
Spiders of Europe
Spiders described in 1973